Divar ("wall") is an Iranian Persian classified ads and E-commerce mobile app, and an online platform for users in Iran founded in Iran in 2012 with sections devoted to real estate, vehicles, goods, community service, Industrial equipment and jobs. On average, Divar’s users post more than 139.7 million new ads & over 53.1 million users open the app annually based on the latest published annual report.

Ads 
To use this app, users must register, have a valid National Iranian ID number, and they must pay for posting more than 3 ads.

Control and censor 
The website periodically censors prices of cars, house rental, and real estate.
This program has put 3500 words in its black list, if the user uses these words, the user's chat or post will be blocked. Masseuse/massage ads are censored and deleted.

Features 

 Night Mode
 Supports screen reader
 Accessibility

Foreign investment 
One Dutch company has invested $47 million in the company.

Service 
The app sorts ads by Iranian cities, districts, and categories
 Real estate
 Vehicles
 Electronics
 Home
 Services
 Personal
 Entertainment and leisure
 Social
 Business
 Job hiring and employment

Award 
Iran web and mobile festival – best accessibility features

See also 

 Iran economy
 Sheypoor (software)

References

External links 

 
 https://play.google.com/store/apps/details?id=ir.divar&hl=en&gl=US
 https://apps.apple.com/us/app/divar/id1492874203

Persian-language websites
E-commerce websites
Mobile software
Android (operating system) software
IOS software
Online companies
Online marketplaces of Iran